The Mato Grosso State University (Unemat) is a public university in the state of Mato Grosso, Brazil. It was created in 1978 and it is funded by the State Government of the Mato Grosso state. Its administrative headquarters is in the municipality of Cáceres, but it also has campuses in the municipalities of Alta Floresta, Alto Araguaia, Barra do Bugres, Colíder, Diamantino, Juara, Luciara, Nova Mutum, Nova Xavantina, Pontes e Lacerda, Sinop and Tangará da Serra.

State universities in Brazil
Educational institutions established in 1993
Education in Mato Grosso
1993 establishments in Brazil